Dr Joseph Sampson Gamgee, MRCS, FRSE (17 April 1828, Livorno, Italy – 18 September 1886) was a surgeon at the Queen's Hospital (later the General Hospital) in Birmingham, England. He pioneered aseptic surgery (having once shared lodgings with Joseph Lister), and, in 1880 invented Gamgee Tissue, an absorbent cotton wool and gauze surgical dressing.

Life

He was the son of Joseph Gamgee (1801–1895), a veterinary surgeon in Leghorn, Italy, and his wife, Mary Ann West (1799-1873). He was the sibling of Dr John Gamgee, inventor and Professor of Anatomy and Physiology at Dick Veterinary College, Edinburgh and Dr Arthur Gamgee. Sampson studied at the Royal Veterinary College, London. While a veterinary student, he was invited to attend lectures at University College Hospital and his work was so good that he was persuaded to become a student there. His classmate was Joseph Lister with whom he shared lodgings and considered him a close friend.

He obtained a post as House Surgeon at University College Hospital in London. He then served as a surgeon in the British-Italian Legion during the Crimean War. On his return in 1857 he took on the post of Surgeon at Queen's Hospital in Birmingham.

In 1868 he was elected a Fellow of the Royal Society of Edinburgh his proposer being Sir James Young Simpson.

In 1873 he founded the Birmingham Hospital Saturday Fund which raised money for various hospitals in Birmingham from overtime earnings given by workers on nominated Hospital Saturdays. It was the first such fund to raise money in this way for multiple hospitals. Sampson was also the first president of the Birmingham Medical Institute.

In 1881 he retired from active hospital life due to a Haematuria infection. In 1886 his health further worsened during a trip to Dartmouth where he fell fracturing his right femur at its head. He died of Bright's disease in Birmingham on 18 September 1886.

Publications

Researches in Pathological Anatomy and Clinical Surgery (1856)
On the Treatment of Fractures of the Limbs (1871)
A Lecture on Ovariotomy (1871)
On the Treatment of Wounds and Fractures (1883)

Legacy

He gave his name (indirectly, via the tissue) to the hobbit Sam Gamgee in J. R. R. Tolkien's The Lord of the Rings.
There is a blue plaque commemorating him on the Birmingham Repertory Theatre and a library is dedicated to him in the Birmingham Medical Institute.

Family

He married Marion Parker, daughter of an Edgbaston vet, in 1886. They had two sons and two daughters. One son, Leonard Parker Gamgee became a renowned surgeon of Birmingham and his nephew (son of his sister Fanny Gamgee) was Prof Sir D'Arcy Wentworth Thompson (1860–1948).

References

1828 births
1886 deaths
British surgeons
Fellows of the Royal Society of Edinburgh
19th-century British medical doctors
Deaths from kidney disease
People from Livorno